Municipal election for Janakpur took place on 13 May 2022, with all 127 positions up for election across 25 wards. The electorate elected a mayor, a deputy mayor, 25 ward chairs and 100 ward members. An indirect election will also be held to elect five female members and an additional three female members from the Dalit and minority community to the municipal executive.

Nepali Congress Janakpur committee president Manoj Kumar Sah who had resigned from the Nepali Congress for short period to file his candidacy defeated the incumbent Lal Kishor Sah from the People's Socialist Party to become mayor. Nepali Congress gained control of the municipal council from Loktantrik Samajwadi Party. He later joined back Congress party on 25 May 2022.

Background 

Janakpur was established as a municipality in 1962. The sub-metropolitan city was created in 2014 by incorporating neighboring village development committees into Janakpur municipality. Electors in each ward elect a ward chair and four ward members, out of which two must be female and one of the two must belong to the Dalit community.

In the previous election, Lal Kishore Sah from Rastriya Janata Party Nepal was elected as the first mayor of the sub-metropolitan city after the reinstatement of local levels in Nepal.

Candidate

Manoj Sah 
(Ghantaghar symbol)

Being the party of home constituency of former Deputy Prime Minister Bimalendra Nidhi, Nepali Congress stands as strongest party since the splits in Madhesh based parties. The party municipal committee chairman, Manoj Sah has declared to run as independent Mayor candidate with silent support of top level leaders following the disagreement with central decision to forge alliance.

Sah along with municipal committee secretary Lalbabu Mishra, treasurer Birendra Yadav and whole municipal committee resigned against the decision of party chairman Sher Bahadur Deuba to support other party candidate. So a sympathetic vote is expected to swing on Sah as well. He on 22 April 2022, declared that they resigned in coordination and approval of the 25 ward committees of party. He also declared that it was a temporary halt to party politics and he would return to the party after winning the elections. Previously, Brikhesh Chandra Lal, Rajdev Mishra and Bajrang Sah have won as independent candidate of mayor post in Janakpur and returned to Nepali Congress party after winning the elections.

In addition to Nepali Congress caders and voters, CPN (Unified Socialist) stood in support of Manoj Sah. Top leader of party Ram Chandra Jha, asked voters to make arrogant and corrupt candidate loose the election.

Balram Mahato 
(Mango symbol)

Mahato, a proprietor of Raman Construction is an independent candidate and has received mango election symbol. Mahato is seen the second strongest candidate after Manohj Sah for mayoral post.

Lal Kishor Sah 
(Umbrella symbol)

The People's Socialist Party holds the former mayor Lal Kishor Shah as their mayoral candidate. Currently, Sah is highly unpopular due to various allegations of corruption, the Janaki temple issue, waste management, and an accident with a government jeep worth 2 crore.

Manoj Chaudhary 
(Cycle symbol)

The Loktantrik Samajbadi Party is about to run Manoj Chaudhary who had given candidacy in from Ramasapa in 2013 Constituent Assembly election from Dhanusha 4 and had lost receiving some 500 votes only.

Janki Ram Sah 
(Lantern symbol)

Janki Raman Sah was expected to run as mayoral candidate from CPN (UML). in the eve of election, he didn't receive ticket and is now a rebel candidate from CPN (UML). He is immediate past chairperson of Janakpur 7.

Shiv Shankar Sah "Hira" 
(Sun symbol)

Sah is mayoral candidate from CPN (UML). He is a businessman.

Terai Madhesh Loktantrik Party 
(Kalas symbol)

Similarly, Terai Madhesh Loktantrik Party led by former mayor Brikhesh Chandra Lal is also contesting the election. The party has fielded former Loktantrik Samajwadi Party, Nepal cader Bibha Thakur as mayor candidate.

Mayor and deputy mayor candidates

Opinion Poll

Mayoral post 

From the summary of result, it was found that Manoj Sah and Balram Mahato had a close contest while both being independent candidate. No match was found between independent candidates duo and other party candidates. People said it was common as no party candidate had won mayor in Janakpur since 2046 and 2074 election was the only exception. Previously, Brikhesh Chandra Lal, Bajrang Sah and Rajdev Mishra have won as independent candidate and later joined back Nepali Congress.

The common voice of citizen was that both Madhesbadi leaders Lal Kishor Sah and Rajendra Mahato did nothing for the city. Majority of voters were guilty for voting them. People yelled that Manoj Sah who was the first runner up of previous election while he had regularly visited them since a long and raised their voice to leadership. they added that they would vote for him in Ghantaghar symbol. In spite of alliance, the support base of incumbent mayor Lalkishor Sah was seen to have largely diminished while people were largely unhappy with madheshi parties which were divided into People's Socialist Party, Nepal, Loktantrik Samajwadi Party, Nepal, Terai Madhesh Loktantrik Party and Janamat Party. Even CPN (UML) voters were divided into rebel candidate Janaki Ram Sah and Shiv Shankar Sah "Hira".

To sum up, a majority of voters south and east of Janaki temple were seen to be close to Manoj Sah while a majority of voters north and west of temple were seen to be close to Balram Mahato.

Ward wise

Exit polls

Mayoral results

Ward results

Ward wise electoral details

Summary of results by ward

Council formation

Out of total 127 seats in municipal corporation, Nepali Congress won majority of 69. Later a group of dessidents joined back Nepali Congress increasing the tally to 76 which remains 60% majority. Loktantrik Samajwadi Party which had obtained majority in previous election could manage to win just 10 seats though lead by Rajendra Mahato due to corrption, not fulfilling promises, etc. As a result, it was almost cleanswept from the region. The CPN (UML) emerged as chief opposition winning just half seats as much as Nepali Congress.

Incidents

Buying votes 
Mushlim commission chief Samim Miya Ansari was reported to have been caught with money bag with 5 crores from Hotel Sitasaran, Janakpurdham. Ansari was appointed by KP Oli led government. It was reported that Ansari was buying votes for CPN (UML) rebellion candidate Janki Ram Sah after which public reported the incident to police. As a result, he along with party municipal committee chairman of CPN (UML), Surendra Bhandari was arrested red hand from the location. Previously, former minister and CPN (UML) leader Julie Kumari Mahato was caught conducting election program in Janakpur in zero hour. Now, it's thought to create huge loss to party in the region as the party got decided into two factions after the incident.

Later, chairman of Muslim Commission, Ansari confessed conducting a press conference that he  had dispute with Ansari the previous night and Raghubir Mahasheth wanted him to act like a slave. After this incident, he sent a team of people led by CPN (UML) municipal committee chairman Surendra Bhandari to abuse Muslim Commission chairman Samim Miya Ansari. Ansari gave statement against Mahasheth couple and asked government and KP Sharma Oli to take strict action against them else he would break his silence.

Later, a resident of Madhesh Province Manish Rauniyar asked the authorities to keep sight on masjids tonight.

See also 

 2022 Nepalese local elections
 2022 Lalitpur municipal election
 2022 Kathmandu municipal election
 2022 Pokhara municipal election
 2022 Provincial Assembly of Madhesh Province election

References

Janakpur